John Gabriel Pinone Jr. (born February 19, 1961) is a retired American professional basketball player.

High school
Pinone played competitively at South Catholic High School in Hartford, leading the team to the Class L state championship in 1977 and 1979.  Early in the 1978–79 season, Pinone and South Catholic defeated Middletown, ending their 80-game winning streak, longest in state history.

College career
Pinone played collegiate basketball for Villanova's Wildcats from 1979 to 1983. He was named a third-team All-American as a senior. Pinone earned first-team All-Big East Conference honors three times, and was a first-team All-Philadelphia Big 5 selection four times. Pinone was the only freshman in Villanova history to lead the team in scoring, and Villanova retired his number 45 in 1995.

Playing career

Clubs
A third-round draftee in 1983, Pinone played seven games in the National Basketball Association (NBA) for the Atlanta Hawks in the 1983–84 season. After spending the rest of the season in the Ohio Mixers, of the CBA, and earning a place in the 1984 CBA All-Star Game; he joined Estudiantes of the Spanish Liga ACB in the 1984–85 season, and played there through the 1992–93 season. 

He won the Spanish Cup in the 1991–92 season, and contributed to Estudiantes reaching the 1992 EuroLeague Final Four. In his Liga ACB tenure with Estudiantes, Pinone played 12,306 minutes, played in 332 games, scored 6,175 points, secured 2,193 rebounds, and averaged 18.6 points per game. He was selected for the ACB All-Star Game in 1989 and 1991. During the nine seasons he played with Estudiantes, Pinone left a memorable mark in the history of the club, because of his solid team basketball playing style, and his competitive character.

National team
Pinone played for the US national team in the 1982 FIBA World Championship, where he won the silver medal.

Coaching career
Pinone later became the Cromwell High School boys' basketball team coach, and coached them to state championships in the 2009, 2018, and 2023 seasons.

Personal life
Pinone pleaded guilty, in October 2010, to a misdemeanor of filing a false tax return, and in December 2010, he was sentenced to six months of home confinement, six months probation, and a $10,000 fine.

References

External links

FIBA Archive Profile
FIBA EuroLeague Profile
Spanish League Archive Profile 

1961 births
Living people
All-American college men's basketball players
American expatriate basketball people in Spain
American men's basketball coaches
American men's basketball players
Atlanta Hawks draft picks
Atlanta Hawks players
Basketball coaches from Connecticut
Basketball players from Hartford, Connecticut
CB Estudiantes players
High school basketball coaches in Connecticut
Liga ACB players
Ohio Mixers players
Power forwards (basketball)
Sportspeople from Hartford, Connecticut
United States men's national basketball team players
Villanova Wildcats men's basketball players
1982 FIBA World Championship players